The Kawai K1 is a  61 key  synthesizer manufactured in 1988 by Kawai. It is an entry-level and low fidelity synthesizer and not as feature rich as the Kawai K4 and was released to compete with the Roland D50 and Korg M1 synthesizers. The patch memory can be doubled with a DC-8 memory card which was available separately.

Features
The K1 features 256 8-bit PCM waveforms (204 additive waveforms and 52 acoustic samples), AM (Ring modulation), and a 16×2 character LCD.

Modes
The four modes of operation are:

 Mono
 Polyphonic
 Split
 Unison

Percussion
The K1 includes drum kits and sounds (acoustic and electronic kits, cymbals as well as some tuned percussion), so can be used to create full rhythm backing when sequenced. The K1II model has 32 percussion sounds.

Mostly known for
Percussive sounds, organs, haunting pads, strings and FM bass sounds and acoustic bass.

Notable users
 Bile
 Cirrus
 drexciya
 EMF
 LFO
 Lab 4
 Pochonbo Electronic Ensemble (band)

Kawai K1R and K1M
A 1U rackmount version of the K1 was produced called the K1r.
Also a module version called K1M was released. Both have the same synth engine as the keyboard version.

See also
Kawai K4

References

External links
http://www.synthmanuals.com/manuals/kawai/k1/owners_manual/k1ownersmanual.pdf

Kawai synthesizers
Digital synthesizers
Polyphonic synthesizers